David Henry Souter (30 March 1862 – 22 September 1935) was an Australian artist and journalist. A stocky and humorous man, Souter wrote short stories, verse, light articles and plays, with a capable and ready pen. He did a fair amount of painting in watercolor, but his reputation rests on his black-and-white work, which, considering the mass of it, was very even in quality.  He also illustrated volumes written by Ethel Turner and other Australian authors.

Biography 
Souter was born in Aberdeen, Scotland, the son of David Henry Souter, an engineer, and his wife Ann Smith, née Grant. He did an apprenticeship under a house painter and sign maker when he was 12. Souter studied art at the local branch of the South Kensington school, studying drawing, contributed to a local journal from 1880, Bon Accord, and in 1881 relocated to Natal, where he engaged in journalism.

Souter married Jessie Swanson (died 1932) on 17 February 1886 and, together moved in 1886 to Melbourne, Australia, then in 1887 settled in Sydney, where Souter obtained a position as an illustrator with John Sands and Co., some time later moving to William Brooks & Co. Ltd. Souter contributed cartoons to The Tribune, and in 1888 founded the "Brush Club" for members under 26 years of age, of which he became president. In 1892 he began contributing drawings to The Bulletin, and for 35 years had at least one drawing in every issue. There are various stories about the cat which so frequently appeared in his drawings, one being that it evolved from a blot that fell on a drawing at the last moment, and another that it first appeared to fill in a blank space. Some of Souter's cat studies appear in the children's nonsense rhyme book he wrote, entitled Bush Babs: with pictures (1933).

When the Society of Artists was established at Sydney in 1895 Souter was elected to the council, and from 1901 to 1902 was its president. He started drawing cartoons for the Tribune and News of the Week. In 1895 he became the lead cartoonist for The Bulletin, which he remained until he died. Souter was art editor of Art and Architecture from 1904 to 1911, and for many years was associated with William Brooks and Company and illustrated many of the school books issued by them. In his later years he was on the editorial staff of Country Life.
He was the author of the book and libretto (Alfred Hill wrote the music) for the 1917 comic opera The Rajah of Shivapore, and also designed the costumes.

Souter died suddenly at his home in Bondi, New South Wales on 22 September 1935, and was survived by two sons and three daughters.

Publications 
His separate publications were The Grey Kimono: the Libretto of an Operetta (1902).

Ten of Souter's watercolor paintings were shown at the exhibition of the Society of Artists, held at Melbourne in 1907. A scrapbook containing a collection of his earlier work from the Bulletin is in the public library, Melbourne. A collection of his World War I cartoons, reprinted from the Stock and Station Journal, was published at Sydney in 1915.

Gallery of works

References

External links 
 Bush babs: with pictures / by D.H. Souter at the National Library of Australia

1862 births
1935 deaths
Australian editorial cartoonists
Australian illustrators
Australian journalists
Scottish emigrants to Australia